Mardani Jhumar( also Mardana Jhumar) is a Nagpuri folk dance  performed by men in the  Indian states of Jharkhand, Chhattisgarh and Odisha. It is performed after harvest in fair. Men wear ghongroo, hold sword, shield and dance in a circle by holding each other's hand.  Musical instruments used in this dance are mandar, nagara, dhak and Shehnai or bansi. The dance movement reflects masculine energy. Sometimes women dancers accompany them, who are known as Nacni.

References 

Folk dances of Jharkhand
Folk dances of Odisha
Folk dances of Chhattisgarh
Nagpuri culture
Circle dances